Azizbek Amanov (Uzbek Cyrillic: Азизбек Аскарович Аманов; born 30 October 1997) is a Uzbek footballer who plays as a midfielder for Nasaf in the Uzbekistan Super League.

Houners
Lokomotiv Tashkent
Uzbekistan Super League: 2017, 2018
Uzbekistan Cup: 2017
Uzbekistan Super Cup: 2019
 
Esteghlal
Iran Pro League: 2021–22
Iranian Super Cup:  2022
individual 
 Best midfielder of 2021–22 Persian Gulf Pro League

References

External links

 

1997 births
Living people
Association football midfielders
Uzbekistani footballers
PFC Lokomotiv Tashkent players
Buxoro FK players
Esteghlal F.C. players
FC Nasaf players
Uzbekistan Super League players
Persian Gulf Pro League players
Uzbekistani expatriate footballers
Expatriate footballers in Iran
Uzbekistani expatriate sportspeople in Iran